George Thompson (November 29, 1947 – June 8, 2022) was an American professional basketball player.  A 6'2" guard, he attended Erasmus Hall High School from which he graduated in 1965.  He then attended Marquette University, where he played for coach Al McGuire.
He held the Marquette scoring record for 40 years, and held the single season scoring record of over 20 ppg for 50 years before his record was broken by Markus Howard.

He was selected by the Boston Celtics in the fifth round of the 1969 NBA draft but began his career with the Pittsburgh Pipers of the upstart American Basketball Association.  Thompson played five seasons (1969–1974) in the ABA, including two with the Memphis Tams, appearing as an All-Star three times.  He then played one season with the Milwaukee Bucks of the NBA, in 1974–75.  He scored 8,114 combined ABA/NBA career points.

Thompson holds the ABA record for free throws attempted in a single game with 30.

Thompson was elected to the Wisconsin Athletic Hall of Fame in 2001. He was inducted into the New York City Basketball Hall of Fame in 2013. Thompson is also in the Marquette Hall of Fame and was inducted into the Brooklyn New York Hall of Fame in October 2016. He died on June 8, 2022, of complications from diabetes.

Career statistics

ABA

|-
| align="left" | 1969–70
| align="left" | Pittsburgh
| 54 || - || 18.8 || .441 || .219 || .677 || 1.7 || 1.4 || - || - || 13.0
|-
| align="left" | 1970–71
| align="left" | Pittsburgh
| 82 || - || 30.1 || .471 || .256 || .715 || 3.5 || 2.5 || - || - || 18.5
|-
| align="left" | 1971–72
| align="left" | Pittsburgh
| 70 || - || 41.5 || .481 || .311 || .779 || 5.0 || 3.7 || - || - || 27.0
|-
| align="left" | 1972–73
| align="left" | Memphis
| 80 || - || 36.6 || .456 || .274 || .784 || 3.3 || 5.0 || - || - || 21.6
|-
| align="left" | 1973–74
| align="left" | Memphis
| 78 || - || 35.0 || .475 || .185 || .790 || 3.5 || 5.1 || 1.5 || 0.3 || 19.2
|- class="sortbottom"
| style="text-align:center;" colspan="2"| Career
| 364 || - || 33.1 || .468 || .265 || .760 || 3.5 || 3.7 || 1.5 || 0.3 || 20.1
|}

NBA

|-
| align="left" | 1974–75
| align="left" | Milwaukee
| 73 || - || 27.2 || .443 || - || .785 || 2.5 || 3.1 || 0.9 || 0.1 || 10.7
|- class="sortbottom"
| style="text-align:center;" colspan="2"| Career
| 73 || - || 27.2 || .443 || - || .785 || 2.5 || 3.1 || 0.9 || 0.1 || 10.7
|}

College

|-
| align="left" | 1966–67
| align="left" | Marquette
| 29 || - || - || .500 || - || .658 || 7.2 || - || - || - || 18.0
|-
| align="left" | 1967–68
| align="left" | Marquette
| 29 || - || - || .497 || - || .648 || 8.6 || 1.2 || - || - || 22.9
|-
| align="left" | 1968–69
| align="left" | Marquette
| 29 || - || - || .465 || - || .725 || 7.9 || 1.9 || - || - || 20.2
|- class="sortbottom"
| style="text-align:center;" colspan="2"| Career
| 87 || - || - || .487 || - || .678 || 7.9 || 1.5 || - || - || 20.4
|}

References

External links

1947 births
2022 deaths
20th-century African-American sportspeople
African-American basketball players
American men's basketball players
Basketball players from New York City
Boston Celtics draft picks
Deaths from diabetes
Erasmus Hall High School alumni
Marquette Golden Eagles men's basketball players
Memphis Tams players
Milwaukee Bucks players
Pittsburgh Pipers players
Point guards
Sportspeople from Brooklyn